Colonel Sir Kailash Narain Haksar CIE (20 February 1878 – 1953, Calcutta), also spelled Kailas Narayan Haksar, was  Minister of the princely state of Jammu and Kashmir  from 1942 to 1944, and a former minister in Gwalior State.

He was the son of Har Narain Haksar and grandson of Rai Bahadur Dharam Narain Haksar  CIE. He was appointed a Companion of the Order of the Indian Empire in 1911 and knighted in 1933.

References

1878 births
1953 deaths
Chief Ministers of Jammu and Kashmir (princely state)
Knights Bachelor
Companions of the Order of the Indian Empire
Indian Army personnel
Indian Knights Bachelor
Politicians from British India